Nyctosia tenebrosa is a moth of the subfamily Arctiinae. It was described by Francis Walker in 1866. It is found in Mexico and Guatemala.

References

Lithosiini
Moths described in 1866